Hednota pleniferellus is a species of moth of the family Crambidae. It is found in Australia, in Queensland, New South Wales, Victoria, and Tasmania.

References

Crambinae
Moths of Australia
Moths described in 1863